DarkSpyre is a 1990 video game produced by Event Horizon Software (later known as DreamForge Intertainment) for MS-DOS.  It was released the following year for the Amiga. Darkspyre is a dungeon crawl style role-playing game. It uses top-down graphics and randomly generated dungeons, similar to a roguelike.

in 1992, The Summoning was released as a sequel. It did not rely on DarkSpyre's random dungeon mechanic, instead using pre-designed levels.

Plot
The gods of War, Magic, and Intellect created the Darkspyre to find a champion to overcome the final challenge of mankind. The player must locate the five runes of power within Darkspyre to master the tests and prevent the destruction of the world.

Reception
The game was reviewed in 1991 in Dragon #172 by Hartley, Patricia, and Kirk Lesser in "The Role of Computers" column. The reviewers gave the game 3½ out of 5 stars. The game was reviewed in Computer Gaming World in 1991, with the reviewer stating that "DarkSpyre is a fine game, well suited to gamers who enjoy
true challenges."

Reviews
ASM - Mar, 1991
Amiga Joker (Feb, 1992)

References

External links
DarkSpyre at Lemon Amiga
DarkSpyre at Amiga Hall of Light
DarkSpyre at GameFAQs

1990 video games
Amiga games
DOS games
DreamForge Intertainment games
Dungeon crawler video games
Fantasy video games
Role-playing video games
Single-player video games
Video games developed in the United States